Leinster Lightning was established in 2013, and accorded first-class status in 2017. Since then, they have played first-class, List A and Twenty20 cricket at a number of different home grounds. Their first home first-class match was against North West Warriors in 2017 at Oak Hill Cricket Club Ground in County Wicklow. From 2019, Leinster will play their home matches at College Park, Dublin.

As of 4 September 2018, Leinster Lightning have played four first-class matches, four List A matches, and seven Twenty20 matches at seven different home grounds. The seven grounds that Leinster Lightning have used for home matches are listed below, with statistics complete through the end of the 2018 season.

List of grounds

See also
List of cricket grounds in Ireland

Notes

References

Leinster Lightning
Cricket grounds in Ireland